Jalan Kerja Ayer Lama (Selangor state route B36) is a major road in Selangor, Malaysia.

List of junctions

Roads in Selangor